Songyuan River is a river in Guangdong province, China.

References

Rivers of Guangdong